Princess Janggyeong of the Incheon Yi clan was the third wife of King Sunjong of Goryeo. 

She became his consort in 1083 and after his death, she stayed live outside the palace.  She then discovered to had committed adultery with a male slave from the palace, those made her being deposed from her position. Yi Ja-gyeom (이자겸), her older brother, became a noble and had a high-ranks official, but due to her adultery, he was also involved in this case and dismissed from his position. After Crown Prince Wang U's ascension to the throne, his status was restored and his daughter become Yejong's queen.

Family
Father: Yi-Ho (이호)
Grandfather: Yi Ja-yeon (이자연; 1003–1061)
Uncle: Yi-Seok (이석)
Cousin: Queen Sasuk (사숙왕후)
Uncle: Yi-Jeong (이정; 1025–1077)
Cousin: Yi Ja-ui (이자의; d. 1095)
Cousin: Princess Wonsin (원신궁주)
Aunt: Royal Consort Ingyeong Hyeon-Bi (인경현비)
Aunt: Royal Consort Injeol Hyeon-Bi (인절현비)
Brother: Yi Ja-gyeom (이자겸; d. 1126)
Niece: Queen Sundeok (순덕왕후; d. 1118)
Niece: Deposed Princess Yeondeok (폐연덕궁주; d. 1139)
Niece: Deposed Princess Bokchang (폐복창원주; d. 1195)
Brother: Yi Ja-ryang (이자량; d. 1123)
Husband, formerly first cousin: Sunjong of Goryeo (고려 순종) – No issue.

References

External links
Princess Janggyeong on Encykorea .
장경궁주 on Doosan Encyclopedia .

11th-century births
1083 deaths
Year of birth unknown
Royal consorts of the Goryeo Dynasty
11th-century Korean women